Belenois albomaculatus is a butterfly in the family Pieridae.

Taxonomy
The status and position of this species is unknown, it is possibly not even Afrotropical.

References

Butterflies described in 1779
Pierini